Petrus Stephanus 'Kulu' Ferreira  (born 17 March 1959) is a South African former rugby union player.

Playing career
Ferreira grew up in Kroonstad in the Free State. He represented the Northern Free State schools team at the annual Craven Week tournament in 1976 and in 1977, when he also captained the side. After school he enrolled at Stellenbosch University where he played for the University's different age–group teams. Ferreira made his senior provincial debut for Western Province in 1981 and played for the union until 1985. In September 1985, Ferreira moved to France, where he played for the rugby club in Marmande. He returned to South Africa and the Northern Free State in the middle of 1986, where he continued his rugby career.

Ferreira made his debut for the Springboks on 20 October 1984 against the South American Jaguars at Loftus Versveld in Pretoria. He also played in the second test against the South Americans and scored a try.

Test history

See also
List of South Africa national rugby union players – Springbok no. 540

References

1959 births
Living people
South African rugby union players
South Africa international rugby union players
People from Kroonstad
Western Province (rugby union) players
Rugby union players from the Free State (province)
Rugby union flankers